Rashmi Singh is an Indian lyricist. She received recognition for writing the lyrics of the song "Muskurane". She was awarded the "Best Lyricist" award for the song at the Filmfare awards thus becoming the first female lyricist to get the award. She was subsequently nominated in the category of the "Lyricist of the year in 2015" for her lyrics writing work in CityLights by the Mirchi Music Awards.

Career
Apart from writing her own individual lyrics, she is also a member of lyrics writing duo Rashmi Virag.

Awards and nominations

References

Year of birth missing (living people)
Living people
Filmfare Awards winners
Indian lyricists